Charles Dallas (c. 1767—26 April 1855), was a British military officer and colonial administrator. He served as the last East India Company Governor of Saint Helena.

Early life and family 
Dallas was born in Edinburgh. His father was William Dallas of North Newton (1719/20 – 2 October 1785), by his second wife, Davidona Haliburton (married 16 April 1754 at Old St. Paul's, Edinburgh).  William Dallas, third son and heir to James Dallas of ST. MARTIN’S (baptised 16 June 1661 – 10 November 1740) by his second wife, Barbara Cockburn (married 1703 at Edinburgh), daughter of William Cockburn, merchant in Edinburgh, and his spouse Jean Clerk, and sister of Henrietta Cockburn, wife of William Dallas, W.S. of Budgate.

His mother was Davidona Haliburton, born about 1730, daughter of George Haliburton of Muirhouseland, "late" Provost of Edinburgh, of the family of Muirhouseland; she was served as co-heiress of provision general to her sisters Ann and Elizabeth Haliburton, 3 July 1787.

Military career 
Dallas spent many years in the service of the Honourable East India Company.

During the Napoleonic Wars he joined the Shropshire Corps of Yeomanry, Captain of the Troop, 15 January 1804, promotion granted by Lord Berwick.

He became Colonel of the St. Helena Regiment of Infantry, granted 11 August 1827. Dallas achieved the rank of Brigadier-General at St. Helena and eastward of the Cape of Good Hope on 14 February 1828. On February 6 1828, while still a colonel, he took the oath of governor of St. Helena.

Marriage
Dallas married, on 9 January 1801, at Edinburgh, Janet, only surviving child of George Cockburn Haldane (see Clan Haldane) 18th of Gleneagles (baptised 15 June 1729; marriage certificate 9 May 1766; died 2 March 1799) by his first wife, Bethia, daughter of Thomas Dundas of Fingask And Carronhall, M.P. for Orkney & Shetland, Burgess of Edinburgh, Deputy Lyon King of Arms and Commissioner of Police (born about 1710; 2nd marriage 11 November 1744; died 10 April 1786), by his wife Lady Janet Maitland (born 1720; died 29 December 1805), daughter of the Earl of Lauderdale.

Governor of St. Helena
Brigadier-General Charles Dallas was the last East India Company Governor of Saint Helena, a position he held from 1828–1834.

Death and family
Dallas died on 26 April 1855, at Trefusis House in Exmouth 'in his 88th year', having survived his wife Janet and his three youngest sons. His eldest son, Captain Thomas Dallas Haldane, drowned at sea in 1857.  His three daughters, Bethia, Davidona Eleanor (married Vice-Admiral Francis Harding, fifth son of William Harding of Baraset) and Caroline, all had issue.

References 

1760s births
1855 deaths
Year of birth uncertain
Military personnel from Edinburgh
Governors of Saint Helena
British colonial governors and administrators in Africa
British East India Company Army generals
Shropshire Yeomanry officers